Bertrand Robert (born 16 November 1983 in Saint-Benoît) is a French footballer who plays for AS Excelsior. He is the younger brother of Laurent Robert.

Career
Retiring in the summer 2018, one year later it was announced that Robert had come out of retirement to return the Réunion Island and play for AS Excelsior.

Career statistics
Career statistics

Statistics accurate as of 4 October 2012

References

External links

Panthraxstats

1983 births
Living people
French footballers
French expatriate footballers
Ligue 1 players
Ligue 2 players
Super League Greece players
Cypriot First Division players
Montpellier HSC players
En Avant Guingamp players
FC Lorient players
AC Ajaccio players
Panthrakikos F.C. players
PAOK FC players
Apollon Limassol FC players
AEL Limassol players
Trikala F.C. players
Kavala F.C. players
AS Excelsior players
Footballers from Réunion
Association football midfielders
Association football forwards
French expatriate sportspeople in Greece
French expatriate sportspeople in Cyprus
Expatriate footballers in Greece
Expatriate footballers in Cyprus